The Battle of Altai Mountains, was a major expedition launched against the Northern Xiongnu by the Han Dynasty in June AD 89. The battle was a success for the Han under Dou Xian (d. AD 92).

In June AD 89, the Han dispatched a force which promptly advanced from Jilu, Manyi, and Guyang in three great columns that included their allies, specifically the main army of the Southern Xiongnu. The force of General Dou Xian advanced towards the Northern Chanyu into the Altai Mountains. A large detachment then moved to the northwest, and in the major battle of the campaign they defeated the Northern Chanyu at the Altai Mountains and pursued them westwards. The Han forces killed 13,000 Xiongnu troops and accepted the surrender of 200,000 Xiongnu from 81 tribes.

Dou Xian brought the main body of his troops in triumphal progress north to the Khangai Mountains, west of present-day Kharkhorin. There he carved the cliff Inscriptions of Yanran, composed by his client, the historian Ban Gu, which celebrated the achievement of the battle. This inscription was identified in Dundgovi Province by scholars from Mongolia and China in August 2017.

Aftermath
After the successful campaign of AD 89, the Xiongnu state was destroyed. After the battle, Dou Xian led his forces back, and the "Northern Chanyu", whose name has not survived, sought to negotiate peace. Tuntuhe Chanyu of the Southern Xiongnu, however, was anxious to destroy his rival completely, and early in AD 90, as embassies were still being exchanged, Dou Xian launched an attack, captured his rival's seal and treasure and his wives and daughters.

General Dou Xian soon initiated a punitive expedition against the remaining hostile Xiongnu tribes, subsequently causing the tribes to flee westwards. Dou Xian had reported that the Northern Chanyu was so weak there was no point in treating with him further. In February 91, he mounted a final invasion, with two of his generals Geng Kui and Ren Shang in charge. They advanced from Juyan and defeated the Northern Xiongnu ruler, captured his mother and killed 5,000 of his armies, drove him in flight again to the west from Altayn Nuruu. He was not heard from again. The rest of the Xiongnu left in Dzungaria, specifically near Lake Barkol, had not been directly affected, and some part of the shattered polity was reconstructed under a new chanyu. The new chanyu, however, was killed in 93, and after him no chanyu of the Northern Xiongnu was ever heard of again. On the frontier of the Han dynasty in present-day Mongolia, the hostile Xiongnu state was ended.

References

Bibliography
 
Fan Ye et al., Hou Hanshu. Beijing: Zhonghua Shuju, 1965. 
 
Sima Guang, comp. Zizhi Tongjian. Beijing: Zhonghua Shuju, 1956. 
 
 Tucker, Spencer C. et al. (2010). A global chronology of conflict: From the ancient world to the modern Middle East. Santa Barbara: ABC-CLIO .
An, Tian, "Dou Xian Po Beixiongnu Zhi Zhan" ("The Battle of Dou Xian's Defeating on the Northern Xiongnu"). Encyclopedia of China, 1st ed.
 

Altai Mountains
Altai Mountains
1st century in China
Altai Mountains
89
Altai Mountains